Anna Maree Devenish Meares  (born 21 September 1983) is an Australian retired track cyclist. She currently resides in Adelaide in South Australia where the Australian Institute of Sport's Track Cycling program has its headquarters at the Adelaide Super-Drome.

She has been the 500 metre track time trial world champion on four occasions, and a gold medallist at the Commonwealth and Olympic Games. At the 2015 UCI Track Cycling World Championships Meares took the gold in the keirin—her 11th world title in total, which made her the most decorated female track cyclist of all time.

She was the flag-bearer and captain for the Australian team at the 2016 Summer Olympics, where she won a bronze medal in keirin. This made her the first Australian to win individual medals in four consecutive Olympics.

On 16 October 2016 Meares announced her official retirement from her current competitive cycling career.

Biography
Anna Meares started competitive cycling at the age of 11 in 1994, following her older sister Kerrie Meares into the sport. The family were inspired to take up competitive cycling by Kathy Watt winning a cycling gold medal at the 1994 Commonwealth Games. With the family living in the small Queensland coal-mining town of Middlemount, it was more than two hours drive to the nearest cycling track at Mackay for the girls to train.

Over the course of her career, Meares has talked about how gradually she became aware of her position as a role model, portraying  "a different stereotypical image of what it is to be a strong woman. It's not always about being skinny. It's about your presentation and your confidence and everyone is unique."

In February 2020 she gave birth to a daughter, Evelyn, with her partner Nick Flygger.

2002
In 2002 Meares narrowly missed a bronze medal in the inaugural inclusion of the 500-metre time trial at the 2002 Commonwealth Games in Manchester, while her older sister, Kerrie Meares won the gold medal in the event. She won a bronze medal in the sprint.

2004
During the 2004 Olympic Games in Athens, she won a gold medal, and set a new world record in the Women's 500-metre time trial of 33.952 seconds. Meares had to beat a new Olympic record set just minutes previously by the reigning World Record holder, Yonghua Jiang of China. (See Cycling at the 2004 Summer Olympics). The event was abolished from the Olympic program so Meares could not defend her title in 2008.
Meares also won a bronze medal in the Women's 200m Sprint event in Athens.

In May 2004 at the Time Trial World Titles in Melbourne Meares claimed the title of Women's World time trial champion, and won a silver for the sprint event. Also claimed first in the 2004 World Cup Time Trial in Sydney.

2005
In 2005, Meares enrolled in a Bachelor of Learning Design course at Central Queensland University, but deferred her studies to concentrate on sport.

2008
Meares made an astonishing come back from a very bad cycling accident at the World Cup in January 2008 when she broke her neck. Meares crashed in the third round of the World Cup circuit in Los Angeles in January 2008, seven months out from the Olympics. Meares fractured her C2 vertebra, dislocated her right shoulder, suffered torn ligaments and tendons, a heavily bruised right hip and skin abrasions as a result of skin sliding on wood when she crashed at 65 km/h. Astonishingly she was back on the bike just 10 days after the fall and went through intensive rehabilitation. With the points Meares had secured prior to the crash, she was able to fight her way back and qualify for the 2008 Beijing Olympics.

Meares had an eventful semi-final in the sprint at the 2008 Summer Olympics. Having lost the first heat to her opponent Guo Shuang, she won the second heat. The third heat saw Guo come down the banking too steeply and her front wheel slipped from beneath her. The heat was re-run and although Guo won by a few millimetres, she was relegated for coming down the track and pushing Meares onto the côte d'azure on the final lap.  This put Meares through to the final ride-off for gold against Victoria Pendleton, where she was beaten and received the silver medal.

2012
At the 2012 World Championships which took place in Meares' home country of Australia in Melbourne, Meares was favourite for three gold medals. In the team sprint Meares won silver as Germany set two world records in the event. In qualification for the individual sprint Meares broke the world record for the flying start 200 metres. Meares completed her four laps in just 10.782 seconds shaving 11 thousands of a second off Simona Krupeckaitė's mark. In the semi final Meares faced her old rival Pendleton. Pendleton clashed with the Australian in their first heat and ended up on the floor before Meares was relegated from the second for going outside of her lane. In the decider Pendleton won in a photo finish, with Meares settling for bronze after defeating Lyubov Shulika. In the keirin, Meares won both her qualifying races before reaching the final, where she held off Russian Ekaterina Gnidenko and German Kristina Vogel to win the first of two world championships in Melbourne. Meares set her second world record of the championships in her final event. Meares recorded 33.010 seconds to break the record by .286 of a second which was previously held by Simona Krupeckaitė. With the time Meares won her second title of the championships and equaled Felicia Ballanger's record of ten world titles.

In preparation for the Olympics, Meares and her coach, West, tailored a 'Project Know Thy Enemy' program. The 'Project' involved Meares racing against male sprinter: Alex Bird; who would mimic Pendleton: former "friend" turned "enemy". The objective was to run multiple racing scenarios and find the best tactic to beat "Queen Vic".

At the 2012 London Olympics, Meares qualified for the final of the sprint, where she again faced Victoria Pendleton. In the first sprint of the final, Pendleton crossed the line first, but was controversially relegated after illegally moving off her line as the cyclists sped through the final banking, which many believe was as a result of Meares aggressive riding. Meares won the second sprint to win 2–0 and take the gold medal. When asked about her tactics, perceived as being unsporting, she responded: "this is sport [...] We're not out there to have a cup of tea". She also won a bronze medal with Kaarle McCulloch in the team sprint.

2013
Meares took rest after the 2012 Olympics and skipped the 2013 World Championship. She returned to competitions in July 2013. Later that year she set a new world record of 32.836 seconds in the women's 500 m time trial at the UCI Mexico Track World Cup, making her the first woman to go under 33 seconds in the event.

2015–16
In late February 2015, Meares competed at the world championships and won three medals. She also separated from her husband of nine years, Mark Chadwick, early in 2015.

At the 2016 Rio Olympics Meares took part in three events. She won a bronze medal in the keirin, placing tenth in the individual sprint and fourth in the team sprint.

Commentating
Anna Meares, Phil Liggett, and Robbie McEwen co-hosted the Seven Network broadcast of the 2023 Santos Men’s Tour Down Under used by  Peacock in the US.

Honours
In 2001 Meares was awarded the Australian Junior Women's Track Cyclist of the Year. She was voted Australian Institute of Sport (AIS) Athlete of the Year in 2007 and 2011 and 2011 inducted into the AIS 'Best of the Best'. Between 2004 and 2012 she has been named Australian Elite Female Track Cyclist of the Year seven times, she also became Australian Cyclist of the Year in 2008 and 2012. She served as the Australian flag bearer at the opening ceremony of the 2014 Commonwealth Games opening ceremony.

The Anna Meares Bike Path adjacent to Sir Donald Bradman Drive near Adelaide Airport was named after Meares in 2012. On 9 December 2016, Meares received the Key to the City of Rockhampton.

Meares has a velodrome in Brisbane named after her. It is called the Anna Meares Velodrome and it was opened on 12 November 2016. It was an official venue for the track cycling at the 2018 Commonwealth Games.

In 2021, inducted into Sport Australia Hall of Fame.

Meares is a worldwide ambassador for the Port Adelaide Football Club.

Major results

2001
1st 500 m TT, World Track Championships – Juniors

2002
3rd Sprint, Commonwealth Games, Manchester

2003
2nd Keirin, World Track Championships, Stuttgart

2004
1st  500 m TT, World Track Championships, Melbourne
2nd Sprint, World Track Championships, Melbourne
1st Sprint, Sydney
1st  500 m TT, Olympic Games
3rd  Sprint, Olympic Games

2005
1st 500 m TT, Australian National Track Championships, Adelaide
1st Sprint, Australian National Track Championships, Adelaide
1st Keirin, Australian National Track Championships, Adelaide
1st Sprint, Sydney
1st Keirin, Sydney
2nd 500 m TT, World Track Championships, Los Angeles
3rd Sprint, World Track Championships, Los Angeles
1st Sprint, Oceania Games, Wanganui
1st 500 m TT, Oceania Games, Wanganui

2006
1st Sprint, Australian National Track Championships, Adelaide
2nd Keirin, Australian National Track Championships, Adelaide
1st Sprint, Sydney
1st 500 m TT, Commonwealth Games, Melbourne
2nd Sprint, Commonwealth Games, Melbourne
2nd 500 m TT, World Track Championships, Bordeaux
1st 500 m TT, World Cup, Sydney
1st Team Sprint, World Cup, Sydney

2007
1st 50 m TT, World Track Championships, Palma de Mallorca – New World Record
3rd Team Sprint, World Track Championships, Palma de Mallorca
3rd Sprint, World Track Championships, Palma de Mallorca
3rd Keirin, World Track Championships, Palma de Mallorca
1st Sprint, World Cup, Los Angeles
2nd Team Sprint, World Cup, Los Angeles
1st 500 m TT, Australian National Track Championships, Sydney
1st Team Sprint, Australian National Track Championships, Sydney
2nd Sprint, Australian National Track Championships, Sydney
1st Keirin, Australian National Track Championships, Sydney
3rd Sprint, World Cup, Manchester
3rd Team Sprint, World Cup, Manchester
1st Sprint, Oceania Cycling Championships, Invercargill
2nd Sprint, Sydney
1st 500 m TT, Sydney

2008
1st Sprint, SWE Grand Prix
2nd  Sprint, Olympic Games
2nd Sprint, GP von Deutschland im Sprint

2009
1st 500 m TT, 2009–2010 UCI Track Cycling World Cup Classics, Manchester
1st Team Sprint (with Kaarle McCulloch), 2009–2010 UCI Track Cycling World Cup Classics, Manchester
3rd Keirin, 2009–2010 UCI Track Cycling World Cup Classics, Manchester
1st 500 m TT, 2009–2010 UCI Track Cycling World Cup Classics, Melbourne
1st Keirin, 2009–2010 UCI Track Cycling World Cup Classics, Melbourne
3rd Team Sprint, 2009–2010 UCI Track Cycling World Cup Classics, Melbourne

2010
1st 500 m TT, 2009–10 UCI Track Cycling World Ranking
1st Team sprint, 2009–10 UCI Track Cycling World Ranking
1st 500 m TT, Commonwealth Games
1st Team Sprint, Commonwealth Games
1st Individual Sprint, Commonwealth Games

2011
1st 500 m TT, 2010–11 UCI Track Cycling World Ranking
1st Keirin, 2010–11 UCI Track Cycling World Ranking

2012
1st  Keirin World Track Championships, Melbourne
1st  500 m TT World Track Championships, Melbourne (33.010sec world record)
3rd Sprint World Track Championships, Melbourne (Qualifying 10.782sec world record)
3rd  Team Sprint, Olympic Games
1st  Sprint, Olympic Games

2013
Melbourne Cup on Wheels
1st Sprint
2nd Keirin
2014
Commonwealth Games
1st  500m Time Trial 
2nd  Sprint
Adelaide Cycling Grand Prix
1st Keirin
3rd Sprint
Austral
1st Sprint
2nd Keirin
2nd  500m Time Trial UCI World Track Championships
Oceania Track Championships
2nd  Keirin
2nd  Sprint
3rd Keirin, South Australian Track Classic

2015
1st Keirin, World Track Championships, Yvelines
Oceania Track Championships
1st Team Sprint
3rd Keirin
1st Keirin, South Australian Grand Prix
3rd Keirin, Super Drome Cup

2016
2nd Keirin, ITS Melbourne Grand Prix
3rd   Keirin, Olympic Games, Rio de Janeiro

Sponsorship
Meares is sonsored by Uvex safety and by
Toshiba.

References

External links

 
 
 
 
  (2002–2010)
  (2014)
 
 

1983 births
Living people
Australian Institute of Sport cyclists
Australian female cyclists
Commonwealth Games gold medallists for Australia
Commonwealth Games silver medallists for Australia
Commonwealth Games bronze medallists for Australia
Cyclists at the 2002 Commonwealth Games
Cyclists at the 2004 Summer Olympics
Cyclists at the 2006 Commonwealth Games
Cyclists at the 2008 Summer Olympics
Cyclists at the 2012 Summer Olympics
Cyclists at the 2016 Summer Olympics
Sportspeople from Rockhampton
Olympic bronze medalists for Australia
Olympic cyclists of Australia
Olympic gold medalists for Australia
Olympic silver medalists for Australia
UCI Track Cycling World Champions (women)
Sportswomen from Queensland
Cyclists at the 2010 Commonwealth Games
Olympic medalists in cycling
Medalists at the 2012 Summer Olympics
Medalists at the 2008 Summer Olympics
Medalists at the 2004 Summer Olympics
Medalists at the 2016 Summer Olympics
Cyclists at the 2014 Commonwealth Games
Central Queensland University alumni
Commonwealth Games medallists in cycling
Australian track cyclists
Recipients of the Medal of the Order of Australia
Sport Australia Hall of Fame inductees
Medallists at the 2002 Commonwealth Games
Medallists at the 2006 Commonwealth Games
Medallists at the 2010 Commonwealth Games
Medallists at the 2014 Commonwealth Games